The CBR Brave is an ice hockey team based in Canberra, ACT, Australia and is a member of the Australian Ice Hockey League (AIHL). Founded in 2014 to replace the defunct Canberra Knights, the Brave’s first season in the AIHL was 2014. Canberra have qualified for AIHL Finals seven times and won two championship titles (Goodall Cup) and three premiership titles (H Newman Reid Trophy).  The Brave have signed 104 players in the team’s history, 91 skaters and 13 goaltenders, and dressed 98 of them for at least one AIHL game. Six signed players have never dressed for a Brave game, including three skaters and three goaltenders.

Legend

Statistics complete as of the end of the 2022 AIHL season (2022 CBR Brave season).

Goaltenders

Skaters

References
General

Specific

External links

 CBR Brave official web site
 AIHL official web site
 Elite Prospects Team Profile

 
Australian Ice Hockey League players
Australia sport-related lists
Lists of ice hockey players
Canberra-related lists